Fiestar was a South Korean girl group formed by Kakao M. Before the group's debut, they released a duet with label mate IU titled “Sea of Moonlight” for LOEN Entertainment's collective label album. The track ended up being a domestic success and entered the top ten of the Gaon Digital Chart, earning the group attention before their debut. The group officially debuted on August 31, 2012 with the single album "Vista" and six members: Cao Lu, Jei, Linzy, Hyemi, Cheska and Yezi.

The group released their second single album "We Don't Stop" on November 9, this time to mixed reviews. On March 20, 2014, member Cheska officially left the group. In July of that same year, they released a song titled "One More" to backlash and controversy due to its supposedly risqué lyrics, the song ended up being banned from broadcast by MBC, and the group had to change the lyrics for their follow up promotions. The group's first mini album was released in March 2015 titled Black Label. The group's second mini album was released in March 2016 titled A Delicate Sense. Two months later, the group released the song "Apple Pie" which ended up being their last single before the group's official disbandment in May 2018 following their contract expiration, in which four of the members decided not to renew.

History

Pre-debut
Prior to their debut, the members of Fiestar had been training as a group for two years and individually for an average of four years.

Cao Lu had previously debuted as a soloist in China after winning a 2004 CCTV singing contest. Her album Cat was released in 2005 under the stage name LuLu.

Yezi was previously an underground rapper prior to becoming an idol. She released a majority of mixtapes and received positive reviews from netizens before debut.

The group's leader, Jei, had previously been a model for online clothing stores and appeared in music videos including Infinite's "Paradise", and Bongshil Sister's "My Love". She also featured on Taw's "Happy Hours", under the stage name Joo.

Linzy had been a trainee under YG Entertainment and was intended to be a 2NE1 member and then a member of another YG girl group, before the group was scrapped and even disbanded before debut. In 2010, she recorded a song for the Korean drama Obstetrics and Gynecology.

2012–2013: Debut and further releases
Before their official debut, Fiestar released a duet with label mate IU for LOEN Entertainment's collective label album. The track was titled "Sea of Moonlight" and was a domestic chart success. They also collaborated with Tiger JK for the pre-release song "Wicked".

The group released their first official single, "Vista", on August 31, 2012. The tracks from the corresponding EP all charted on the K-pop Billboard Hot 100.

Fiestar's second single "We Don't Stop" was released on November 9, with the B-side track "Sweet Love" featuring ballad singer Kim Yeon-woo. Live promotions for the album began on Music Bank the following day. Alongside group promotions, Jei appeared in TVN's reality program Romantic and Idol, and alongside IU for the comedy show Gag Concert along with Jei, Cao Lu and Linzy. Vocalists Linzy and Hyemi appeared on KBS's 1000 Song Challenge, and the group as a whole made appearances on Weekly Idol and Dream Team 2. They also endorsed HIM Magazine.

In 2013, Linzy played Sharpay Evans in the CJE&M Korean musical adaptation of High School Musical, sharing the role with The Grace's Dana. The show's run began on July 2 at the Blue Square Samsung Card Hall. During the year, Fiestar also participated in a video series entitled "Fiestar's A-HA! For the Global K-Pop Fan" as well as endorsements for the Samsung Galaxy S4.

On August 27, a pre-release single, "Whoo!" featuring Eric Benét, was released online. Despite there being no live promotions for the single, it was a chart success.

In September, LOEN Entertainment created the sub-label Collabodadi, under which Fiestar would continue to release their music. On November 1, the group released the single "I Don't Know" from the EP Curious, making their stage comeback on Music Core the following day. Following promotions, the reality television show Channel FIESTAR! aired on SBS MTV.

2014–2015: Cheska's departure and Black Label
On March 20, 2014, LOEN Entertainment announced that Cheska would be leaving the group and would not be replaced by any new members, and Fiestar's comeback was scheduled for mid-July after being postponed due to the Sewol ferry tragedy.

On June 16, a single in collaboration between The Friends and Fiestar for the 2014 Brazil World Cup titled "I Love Korea" was released. On July 1, the music video for the single "One More" was released.

On March 4, 2015, Fiestar's first mini album, Black Label, was released with title track "You're Pitiful". Six months after the album's release, on September 22, Collabodadi was dissolved, with LOEN Tree becoming the sole in-house label of LOEN Entertainment. Thus, Fiestar returned to LOEN Tree after a two-year run under Collabodadi.

On December 17, Cao Lu appeared on Radio Star as a guest along with rapper Jessi, Got7's Jackson, and Lena Park as part of the Outsiders special. She gained national attention for her appearance on the program and became the number one trending topic on Naver, with Fiestar also trending.

2016–2018: Last activities and disbandment 
In March 2016, Fiestar released their second mini album A Delicate Sense. The album consists of six tracks, including lead single "Mirror". Notably, all the members also participated in the production.

On May 31, 2016, Fiestar returned with the digital single "Apple Pie".

On May 15, 2018, after a year of no group activities, it was announced that Fiestar had officially disbanded following the expiration of four of the members' contracts on April 30 and only Cao Lu's contract would be expiring on May 31.

On May 29, 2018, former member Cheska announced via her Instagram that she was leaving Korea and quitting music. She thanked her fans for supporting her, but stated that she decided to walk away as "music was slowly killing [her]".

"One More" controversy 

Fiestar's single "One More" was banned from broadcast by MBC for its supposedly risqué lyrics. While the song had originally passed scrutiny from the three major broadcasting stations (KBS, MBC and SBS), backlash from public commentators forced the networks to review the song's content. While their representatives claimed that the song was innocuous, the group re-recorded the song and changed the lyrics. The controversy spawned from the lyrics prompted MBC to crack down further on songs with ambiguous or easily misconstrued lyrical content.

Former members 
 Cao Lu (Hangul: 차오루)
 Jei (재이)
 Linzy (린지)
 Hyemi (혜미)
 Cheska (체스카)
 Yezi (예지)

Discography

Extended plays

Singles

Other charted songs

Soundtrack appearances

Other appearances

Videography

Music videos

Awards and nominations

Notes

References

External links

 Fiestar on LOEN Entertainment

K-pop music groups
Kakao M artists
Musical groups established in 2012
South Korean dance music groups
South Korean electronic musicians
South Korean girl groups
South Korean synthpop groups
2012 establishments in South Korea
Musical quintets
Musical groups disestablished in 2018
Women in electronic music